iTunes New Artist Spotlight is a list of featured new artists' releases organized by genre.  The list is decided upon by iTunes editorial staff based on various factors sometimes including pre-order sales, musical quality and length of time artist has been active.

United States

2015

United Kingdom

2011 
 Alice Gold
 Benjamin Francis Leftwich
 Clare Maguire
 Gypsy & The Cat
 James Blake
 Jamie Woon
 Jessie J
 Katy B
 Summer Camp
 The Joy Formidable
 The Vaccines
 Treefight for Sunlight

2012 
 Dry the River
 Emeli Sandé
 Keaton Henson
 Kindness
 Labrinth
 Lana Del Rey
 Lianne La Havas
 Maverick Sabre
 Michael Kiwanuka
 Niki & The Dove
 The Staves
 Totally Enormous Extinct Dinosaurs

2013 
 Azealia Banks
 Bastille
 Daughter
 Disclosure
 Foxes
 Gabrielle Aplin
 Haim
 Kodaline
 Laura Mvula
 Rudimental
 Syron
 The 1975

2014 
 BANKS
 Chlöe Howl
 Dan Croll
 George Ezra
 Josh Record
 Laura Welsh
 Luke Sital-Singh
 MØ
 Saint Raymond
 Sam Smith
 Sampha
 Say Lou Lou
 SOHN
 Wolf Alice

2015 
 Becky Hill
 Ben Khan
 Circa Waves
 Ibeyi
 James Bay
 Josef Salvat
 MNEK
 Nothing but Thieves
 SOAK
 Years & Years

2016 
 Billie Marten
 Blossoms
 Clean Cut Kid
 Frances
 Jack Garratt
 Låpsley
 Mura Masa
 NAO
 Rationale
 Spring King
 The Japanese House
 Zak Abel

2017 
 AJ Tracey
 Dan Caplen
 DAVE
 Declan McKenna
 Jorja Smith
 JP Cooper
 Liv Dawson
 Rag'n'Bone Man
 Ray BLK
 RAYE
 The Amazons
 The Magic Gang

Japan

2013 
 Aoi Yamazaki
 CHEESE CAKE
 Haruka to Miyuki
 Huwie Ishizaki
 Kuroki Nagisa
 nicoten
 Passepied
 Rina Sumioka
 Samezame
 Tofubeats
 Tricot
 Yoh Shibusawa

2014 
 Ailee
 banvox
 BLUE ENCOUNT
 Charisma.com
 Fhána
 KEYTALK
 Rei Yasuda
 Shiori Niiyama
 Suck a Stew Dry
 TANAKA ALICE
 USAGI
 WHITE JAM

References 

iTunes News

ITunes